Amar Deep is a 1979 Bollywood romantic drama film directed by R. Krishnamurthy and K. Vijayan and produced by K. Balaji. The film stars Rajesh Khanna in the lead role supported by Vinod Mehra, Shabana Azmi and introduces new actress Deepa. The lyrics were written by Anand Bakshi and the music was composed by Laxmikant-Pyarelal. The film was a remake of Tamil film Dheepam which itself was a remake of Malayalam film Theekkanal. Amardeep was a silver jubilee hit on its release.

Plot
Raja is adopted by a don at a young age. After the don's death, Raja inherits his property. However, wealth and power make him arrogant. He wants to marry Radha, the daughter of his servant, Ramu. Raja asks for Ramu's permission to marry her and Ramu accepts the proposal. But Radha refuses to do so as she loves Kishan. Raja finds out finds out about this and complains to Ramu. Ramu forbids his daughter to meet Kishan. Then Raja finds out a secret from Kishan's past which changes his attitude towards him. He gives Kishan a job and arranges his marriage with Radha. Raja entrusts Kishan with a lot of responsibility which means Kishan has to travel for work all the time. Kishan eventually starts to become suspicious about Raja's kindness towards him. Does Raja want Kishan to be out of the way so he can be near Radha, or is there another reason?

Cast
 Rajesh Khanna as Raja/Sonu
 Vinod Mehra as Kishan
 Shabana Azmi as Radha
 Deven Verma as Rahim
 Bindu as Asha
 Roopesh Kumar as Ramesh
 A. K. Hangal as Ramu 
 Deepa as Lata
 Mithun Chakraborty as Sajan (Guest Appearance)
 Ashok Kumar as Don (Guest Appearance)
 Savitri as Sonu and Kishan's Mother (Guest Appearance)

Soundtrack
Lyrics: Anand Bakshi

References

External links
 
 Amar Deep on bollywoodhungama.com

1979 films
Indian romantic drama films
1970s Hindi-language films
1979 romantic drama films
Films scored by Laxmikant–Pyarelal
Hindi remakes of Malayalam films
Hindi remakes of Tamil films
Films directed by K. Vijayan
Films directed by R. Krishnamoorthy